The National Cultural Treasures declarations are authorized under the National Heritage Act of 2009 and recognized within the Cultural Properties of the Philippines by the Philippine government.

The list includes all declared National Cultural Treasures of the Philippines, including tangible and intangible heritage. Currently, out of the 106 National Cultural Treasures, only three are intangible. The declarations are made by the National Commission for Culture and the Arts and other cultural agencies such as the National Museum of the Philippines, National Library of the Philippines, and National Archives of the Philippines. Any Filipino institution or person can nominate a cultural property for a National Cultural Treasure declaration, whether the property is private or public. If the property is private, the ownership of the property is retained by the private owner and shall not be transferred to the government.

As of May 2018, 75 national cultural treasures are housed in Luzon, 6 national cultural treasures are housed in Mimaropa, 19 national cultural treasures are housed in the Visayas, and 6 national cultural treasures are housed in Mindanao. The Sulu archipelago currently houses no national cultural treasures. Additionally, various national cultural treasures that are originally from Mimaropa, the Visayas, and Mindanao are housed in the National Museum in Manila (Luzon), such as the Quran of Bayang.

National Cultural Treasures classification
The National Cultural Treasures of the Philippines can be classified to three distinct brackets, namely immovable heritage, movable heritage, and intangible heritage.

Immovable heritage includes traditions and living expressions that are passed down from generation to generation within a particular community. There are further classified sub-categories. Those 7 sub categories are, (1) church complexes and colonial fortifications; (2) mosque complexes and temple complexes; (3) indigenous place of worship or dambana complexes; (4) modern and historical residences; (5) structures related to industry, transportation, and public works; (6) archaeological sites; and (7) miscellaneous structures and sites. As of May 2018, 85 national cultural treasures are under the immovable heritage bracket.

Movable heritage are National cultural treasures under the movable heritage bracket, artifacts that are considered worthy of preservation for the future. Further classified sub-categories are: (1) ancient documents or artifacts with pre-colonial writings; (2) archaeological materials; (3) ethnic crafts; (4) historical materials owned by historical persons, families, or organizations; (5) paintings; (6) sculptures; and (7) writings and other literary works. As of May 2018, 18 national cultural treasures are under the movable heritage bracket, although one contains more than 20 heritage objects under the title of 'artifacts and ecofacts in the National Museum in Manila'.

Intangible heritage  is cultural heritage traditions and living expressions that are passed down from generation to generation within a particular community. Five sub-categories of this heritage would be: (1) oral traditions and expressions including language; (2) performing arts; (3) social practices, rituals, and festive events; (4) knowledge and practices concerning nature and the universe; and (5) traditional craftsmanship or the tradition of making crafts, not the craft itself. As of May 2018, 3 national cultural treasures are under the intangible heritage bracket.

Declared national cultural treasures list

See also
Lists of Cultural Properties of the Philippines
List of historical markers of the Philippines
Tourism in the Philippines

References

 
Historic sites in the Philippines
Declared Cultural Properties in the Philippines
Lists of Cultural Properties of the Philippines
Philippines history-related lists